"Someday (Place in the Sun)" is a song by English rapper Tinie Tempah, featuring additional vocals from British singer Ella Eyre and production from iSHi. It was released on 1 November 2013 as part of Tempah's second studio album Demonstration (2013). It entered the UK Singles Chart at number 87 and the UK R&B Chart at number fourteen but was never released as a single.

Background and release
"Someday (Place in the Sun)" is about how Tinie started in the cold, harsh streets of London and had to face many obstacles to get to where he is today (his 'place in the sun'). The song was written by Tinie, Eric Turner and Eshraque Mughal (of "Written in the Stars" fame). The song was never released as a single but digital downloads of the individual track from Demonstration caused it to enter the UK Singles Chart at number 87 and the UK R&B Chart at number fourteen.

Track listing

Personnel
 Patrick "Tinie Tempah" Okogwu – vocals
 Ella Eyre – vocals
 Eric Turner – writer
 Eshraque "iSHi" Mughal – producer, mixing, grand piano, other instruments
 Aryan "Marz" Marzban – mixing
 Erik Arvinder – violin
 Robert Vadadi – guitars
 Richard "Richie Montana" Hoey – vocal production, recording

Charts

Release history

References

2013 songs
Ella Eyre songs
Tinie Tempah songs
Songs written by Tinie Tempah
Songs written by Eshraque "iSHi" Mughal
Songs written by Eric Turner (singer)